Joseph Edward Woodall VC (1 June 1896 – 2 January 1962) was an English recipient of the Victoria Cross, the highest and most prestigious award for gallantry in the face of the enemy that can be awarded to British and Commonwealth forces.

Military career
Woodall was 21 years old and a Lance-Sergeant in the 1st Battalion, The Rifle Brigade (Prince Consort's Own), British Army during the First World War when the following deed took place for which he was awarded the VC:
On 11 April 1918 the 1st Battalion, Rifle Brigade was rushed up in buses to a position on the La Bassée Canal to try to stem the German breakthrough on the Lys. Over the next eleven days it was involved in severe fighting in the area around Hinges and Robecq. On 22 April, 1st Bn, Rifle Brigade, together with the 1st Hampshires, took part in an attack which helped to secure the Canal. It was during this fighting that Lance Sergeant Joseph Woodall won his Victoria Cross on the far side of the canal at La Pannerie, near Hinges.

His citation read:

Investiture and later career
Woodall was invested with his Victoria Cross by King George V at Buckingham Palace on 23 November 1918. He stayed in the Army after the war and on 7 March 1919 became a Second Lieutenant with one of the Service Battalions of The Rifle Brigade. He retired from the Army as a captain in September 1921.

Later life, and death
Woodall did not attend the 1956 VC Centenary Review, although he did attend a Festival of Remembrance in Dublin in November 1956, along with three other VC recipients - Adrian Carton de Wiart, John Moyney and James Duffy.

He died at St. Michael's Hospital, Dún Laoghaire on 2 January 1962 and was buried in Deans Grange Cemetery.

Awards
Medal entitlement of Captain Joseph Edward Woodall - 1st Bn, The Rifle Brigade:
 Victoria Cross
 1914–15 Star
 British War Medal (1914–20)
 Victory Medal (1914–19)
 King George VI Coronation Medal (1937)
 Queen Elizabeth II Coronation Medal (1953)

The medal
His Victoria Cross is displayed at the Imperial War Museum, London, England.

References

Monuments to Courage (David Harvey, 1999)
The Register of the Victoria Cross (This England, 1997)
VCs of the First World War - Spring Offensive 1918 (Gerald Gliddon, 1997)
 Iain 'Scoop' Stewart http://www.victoriacross.org.uk/bbwoodal.htm

External links
Location of grave and VC medal (Dublin)
 A MEMORIAL STONE COMMEMORATING CAPTAIN JOSEPH WOODALL VC HAS BEEN ERECTED IN DEAN'S GRANGE CEMETERY, DUBLIN.
 

1896 births
People from Salford
British World War I recipients of the Victoria Cross
Rifle Brigade officers
British Army personnel of World War I
Burials at Deans Grange Cemetery
Rifle Brigade soldiers
British Army recipients of the Victoria Cross
Deaths from pneumonia in the Republic of Ireland
1962 deaths